Lieutenant-General Vernon Forbes Erskine-Crum, CIE, MC (11 December 1918 – 17 March 1971) was a British Army officer, who briefly served as general officer commanding in Northern Ireland during the early period of the Troubles.

Regimental career
He was born in Calcutta, the younger son of Sir William Erskine Crum, and educated at Eton and New College, Oxford. In 1940 he was commissioned into the Scots Guards, and served with the regiment  for the remainder of the war. He won a Military Cross (MC) during the North-West European campaign in 1944.

Indian service
After training at the Staff College in 1945, he was promoted to temporary Lieutenant-Colonel and posted to the staff in South-East Asia, arriving just after the Japanese surrender. He served as the Conference Secretary to Lord Mountbatten, a position he held for just over a year before returning to regimental duty in England, commanding a company of the 2nd Battalion Scots Guards.

After six weeks, he was recalled by Mountbatten, who had been appointed Viceroy of India, and again served as his Conference Secretary until he left India in 1948. For his services, he was appointed a Companion of the Order of the Indian Empire on 30 December 1947.

Senior Command
On returning from India, he was appointed as the regimental adjutant of the Scots Guards, and then a succession of other administrative posts; adjutant of the Royal Military Academy Sandhurst, brigade major of the Household Brigade, Commandant of the Guards Depot, and Assistant Adjutant General of the London District.

On 9 February 1962, he was promoted colonel, and from 1962 to 1963 was Secretary of the Joint Planning Staff. In 1963 he was appointed to command 4th Guards Brigade Group, promoted to Brigadier on 9 February 1966, and appointed to command 4th Division in 1967.

He was appointed co-ordinator of the Imperial Defence College on 15 October 1969, and Chief Army Instructor there on 1 February 1970. Following this position, he was appointed GOC and Director of Operations in Northern Ireland on 4 February 1971, to replace Lieutenant-General Ian Freeland, but he suffered a heart attack on the 16th and was relieved by Lieutenant-General Harry Tuzo on 2 March.

Death
He died a month after his heart attack, in hospital, on 17 March 1971, aged 52. His brief spell in Northern Ireland witnessed the escalation of tensions, as well as the first death of a British soldier, Gunner Robert Curtis, on 6 February.

Family
He married Rosemary Douglas, the daughter of Brigadier Sir Douglas Dawson and Lady Aimée Dawson (GBE) in 1948. They had one son, Brigadier Douglas Erskine Crum.

References

|-

1918 births
1971 deaths
Alumni of New College, Oxford
British Army lieutenant generals
British Army personnel of World War II
Companions of the Order of the Indian Empire
People educated at Eton College
British military personnel of The Troubles (Northern Ireland)
Recipients of the Military Cross
Scots Guards officers
Graduates of the Staff College, Camberley
Academics of the Royal Military Academy Sandhurst
Military personnel of British India